The following is a list of the bird species recorded in the Dominican Republic. The avifauna of the Dominican Republic included a total of 320 species as of July 2022, according to Bird Checklists of the World (Avibase).  Of them, 14 have been introduced by humans and 81 are rare or accidental. One is endemic and an additional 28 species are endemic to the island of Hispaniola, which the Dominican Republic shares with Haiti. One species is extinct. 

This list is presented in the taxonomic sequence of the Check-list of North and Middle American Birds, 7th edition through the 63rd Supplement, published by the American Ornithological Society (AOS). Common and scientific names are also those of the Check-list, except that the common names of families are from the Clements taxonomy because the AOS list does not include them.

The following tags have been used to highlight several categories of occurrence.

(A) Accidental - a species that rarely or accidentally occurs in the Dominican Republic
(E-DR) Endemic-DR - a species endemic to the Dominican Republic
(E-H) Endemic-H - a species endemic to the island of Hispaniola
(I) Introduced - a species introduced directly to the Dominican Republic or elsewhere in the New World

Ducks, geese, and waterfowl
Order: AnseriformesFamily: Anatidae

Anatidae includes the ducks and most duck-like waterfowl, such as geese and swans. These birds are adapted to an aquatic existence with webbed feet, flattened bills, and feathers that are excellent at shedding water due to an oily coating.

White-faced whistling-duck, Dendrocygna viduata (A)
Black-bellied whistling-duck, Dendrocygna autumnalis (A)
West Indian whistling-duck, Dendrocygna arborea
Fulvous whistling-duck, Dendrocygna bicolor
Canada goose, Branta canadensis (A)
Orinoco goose, Oressochen jubatus (A)
Muscovy duck, Cairina moschata
Wood duck, Aix sponsa (A)
Blue-winged teal, Spatula discors
Northern shoveler, Spatula clypeata
Gadwall, Mareca strepera (A)
Eurasian wigeon, Mareca penelope (A)
American wigeon, Mareca americana
Mallard, Anas platyrhynchos  (I)
White-cheeked pintail, Anas bahamensis
Northern pintail, Anas acuta
Green-winged teal, Anas crecca
Canvasback, Aythya valisineria (A)
Redhead, Aythya americana (A)
Ring-necked duck, Aythya collaris
Greater scaup, Aythya marila (A)
Lesser scaup, Aythya affinis
Hooded merganser, Lophodytes cucullatus (A)
Red-breasted merganser, Mergus serrator (A)
Masked duck, Nomonyx dominicus
Ruddy duck, Oxyura jamaicensis

Guineafowl
Order: GalliformesFamily: Numididae

Guineafowl are a group of African, seed-eating, ground-nesting birds that resemble partridges, but with featherless heads and spangled gray plumage.

Helmeted guineafowl, Numida meleagris (I)

New World quail
Order: GalliformesFamily: Odontophoridae

The New World quails are small, plump terrestrial birds only distantly related to the quails of the Old World, but named for their similar appearance and habits.

Northern bobwhite, Colinus virginianus (I)

Pheasants, grouse, and allies
Order: GalliformesFamily: Phasianidae

The Phasianidae are a family of terrestrial birds which consists of quails, partridges, snowcocks, francolins, spurfowls, tragopans, monals, pheasants, peafowls, and jungle fowls. In general, they are plump (although they vary in size) and have broad, relatively short wings.

Red junglefowl, Gallus gallus (I) (A) (feral)

Flamingos
Order: PhoenicopteriformesFamily: Phoenicopteridae

Flamingos filter-feed on shellfish and algae. Their oddly shaped beaks are specially adapted to separate mud and silt from the food they consume and, uniquely, are used upside-down.

American flamingo, Phoenicopterus ruber

Grebes
Order: PodicipediformesFamily: Podicipedidae

Grebes are small to medium-large freshwater diving birds. They have lobed toes and are excellent swimmers and divers. However, they have their feet placed far back on the body, making them quite ungainly on land.

Least grebe, Tachybaptus dominicus
Pied-billed grebe, Podilymbus podiceps

Pigeons and doves
Order: ColumbiformesFamily: Columbidae

Pigeons and doves are stout-bodied birds with short necks and short slender bills with a fleshy cere.

Rock pigeon, Columba livia (I)
Scaly-naped pigeon, Patagioenas squamosa
White-crowned pigeon, Patagioenas leucocephala
Plain pigeon, Patagioenas inornata
Eurasian collared-dove, Streptopelia decaocto (I)
Common ground dove, Columbina passerina
Ruddy quail-dove, Geotrygon montana
White-fronted quail-dove, Geotrygon leucometopia (E-DR)
Key West quail-dove, Geotrygon chrysia
White-winged dove, Zenaida asiatica
Zenaida dove, Zenaida aurita
Mourning dove, Zenaida macroura

Cuckoos
Order: CuculiformesFamily: Cuculidae

The family Cuculidae includes cuckoos, roadrunners, and anis. These birds are of variable size with slender bodies, long tails, and strong legs.

Smooth-billed ani, Crotophaga ani
Yellow-billed cuckoo, Coccyzus americanus
Mangrove cuckoo, Coccyzus minor
Black-billed cuckoo, Coccyzus erythropthalmus (A)
Bay-breasted cuckoo, Coccyzus rufigularis (E-H)
Hispaniolan lizard-cuckoo, Coccyzus longirostris (E-H)

Nightjars and allies
Order: CaprimulgiformesFamily: Caprimulgidae

Nightjars are medium-sized nocturnal birds that usually nest on the ground. They have long wings, short legs, and very short bills. Most have small feet, of little use for walking, and long pointed wings. Their soft plumage is camouflaged to resemble bark or leaves.

Common nighthawk, Chordeiles minor
Antillean nighthawk, Chordeiles gundlachii
Least pauraque, Siphonorhis brewsteri (E-H)
Chuck-will's-widow, Antrostomus carolinensis
Greater Antillean nightjar, Antrostomus cubanensis

Potoos
Order: NyctibiiformesFamily: Nyctibiidae

The potoos (sometimes called poor-me-ones) are large near passerine birds related to the nightjars and frogmouths. They are nocturnal insectivores which lack the bristles around the mouth found in the true nightjars.

Northern potoo, Nyctibius jamaicensis

Swifts
Order: ApodiformesFamily: Apodidae

Swifts are small birds which spend the majority of their lives flying. These birds have very short legs and never settle voluntarily on the ground, perching instead only on vertical surfaces. Many swifts have long swept-back wings which resemble a crescent or boomerang.

Black swift, Cypseloides niger
White-collared swift, Streptoprocne zonaris
Chimney swift, Chaetura pelagica
Antillean palm-swift, Tachornis phoenicobia

Hummingbirds
Order: ApodiformesFamily: Trochilidae

Hummingbirds are small birds capable of hovering in mid-air due to the rapid flapping of their wings. They are the only birds that can fly backwards.

Hispaniolan mango, Anthracothorax dominicus (E-H)
Ruby-throated hummingbird, Archilochus colubris (A)
Vervain hummingbird, Mellisuga minima
Hispaniolan emerald, Riccordia swainsonii (E-H)

Rails, gallinules, and coots
Order: GruiformesFamily: Rallidae

Rallidae is a large family of small to medium-sized birds which includes the rails, crakes, coots, and gallinules. Typically they inhabit dense vegetation in damp environments near lakes, swamps, or rivers. In general they are shy and secretive birds, making them difficult to observe. Most species have strong legs and long toes which are well adapted to soft uneven surfaces. They tend to have short, rounded wings and to be weak fliers.

Spotted rail, Pardirallus maculatus
Clapper rail, Rallus crepitans
Sora, Porzana carolina
Common gallinule, Gallinula galeata
American coot, Fulica americana
Purple gallinule, Porphyrio martinica
Yellow-breasted crake, Hapalocrex flaviventer (A)
Black rail, Laterallus jamaicensis

Limpkin
Order: GruiformesFamily: Aramidae

The limpkin resembles a large rail. It has drab-brown plumage and a grayer head and neck.

Limpkin, Aramus guarauna

Thick-knees
Order: CharadriiformesFamily: Burhinidae

The thick-knees are a group of waders found worldwide within the tropical zone, with some species also breeding in temperate Europe and Australia. They are medium to large waders with strong black or yellow-black bills, large yellow eyes, and cryptic plumage. Despite being classed as waders, most species have a preference for arid or semi-arid habitats.

Double-striped thick-knee, Burhinus bistriatus

Stilts and avocets
Order: CharadriiformesFamily: Recurvirostridae

Recurvirostridae is a family of large wading birds which includes the avocets and stilts. The avocets have long legs and long up-curved bills. The stilts have extremely long legs and long, thin, straight bills.

Black-necked stilt, Himantopus mexicanus
American avocet, Recurvirostra americana (A)

Oystercatchers
Order: CharadriiformesFamily: Haematopodidae

The oystercatchers are large and noisy plover-like birds, with strong bills used for smashing or prising open molluscs.

American oystercatcher, Haematopus palliatus

Plovers and lapwings
Order: CharadriiformesFamily: Charadriidae

The family Charadriidae includes the plovers, dotterels, and lapwings. They are small to medium-sized birds with compact bodies, short thick necks, and long, usually pointed, wings. They are found in open country worldwide, mostly in habitats near water.

Black-bellied plover, Pluvialis squatarola
American golden-plover, Pluvialis dominica
Pacific golden-plover, Pluvialis fulva (A)
Killdeer, Charadrius vociferus
Semipalmated plover, Charadrius semipalmatus
Piping plover, Charadrius melodus
Wilson's plover, Charadrius wilsonia
Snowy plover, Charadrius nivosus

Jacanas
Order: CharadriiformesFamily: Jacanidae

The jacanas are a group of waders which are found throughout the tropics. They are identifiable by their huge feet and claws which enable them to walk on floating vegetation in the shallow lakes that are their preferred habitat.

Northern jacana, Jacana spinosa

Sandpipers and allies
Order: CharadriiformesFamily: Scolopacidae

Scolopacidae is a large diverse family of small to medium-sized shorebirds including the sandpipers, curlews, godwits, shanks, tattlers, woodcocks, snipes, dowitchers, and phalaropes. The majority of these species eat small invertebrates picked out of the mud or soil. Variation in length of legs and bills enables multiple species to feed in the same habitat, particularly on the coast, without direct competition for food.

Upland sandpiper, Bartramia longicauda (A)
Whimbrel, Numenius phaeopus
Hudsonian godwit, Limosa haemastica
Marbled godwit, Limosa fedoa
Ruddy turnstone, Arenaria interpres
Red knot, Calidris canutus
Stilt sandpiper, Calidris himantopus
Sanderling, Calidris alba
Dunlin, Calidris alpina 
Baird's sandpiper, Calidris bairdii (A)
Least sandpiper, Calidris minutilla
White-rumped sandpiper, Calidris fuscicollis
Buff-breasted sandpiper, Calidris subruficollis
Pectoral sandpiper, Calidris melanotos
Semipalmated sandpiper, Calidris pusilla
Western sandpiper, Calidris mauri
Short-billed dowitcher, Limnodromus griseus
Long-billed dowitcher, Limnodromus scolopaceus (A)
Wilson's snipe, Gallinago delicata
Spotted sandpiper, Actitis macularius
Solitary sandpiper, Tringa solitaria
Lesser yellowlegs, Tringa flavipes
Willet, Tringa semipalmata
Greater yellowlegs, Tringa melanoleuca
Wilson's phalarope, Phalaropus tricolor (A)
Red-necked phalarope, Phalaropus lobatus (A)

Skuas and jaegers
Order: CharadriiformesFamily: Stercorariidae

The family Stercorariidae are, in general, medium to large birds, typically with gray or brown plumage, often with white markings on the wings. They nest on the ground in temperate and arctic regions and are long-distance migrants.

Great skua, Stercorarius skua (A)
Pomarine jaeger, Stercorarius pomarinus
Parasitic jaeger, Stercorarius parasiticus
Long-tailed jaeger, Stercorarius longicaudus (A)

Gulls, terns, and skimmers
Order: CharadriiformesFamily: Laridae

Laridae is a family of medium to large seabirds and includes gulls, kittiwakes, terns and skimmers. They are typically gray or white, often with black markings on the head or wings. They have stout, longish bills and webbed feet. Terns are a group of generally medium to large seabirds typically with gray or white plumage, often with black markings on the head. Most terns hunt fish by diving but some pick insects off the surface of fresh water. Terns are generally long-lived birds, with several species known to live in excess of 30 years. Skimmers are a small family of tropical tern-like birds. They have an elongated lower mandible which they use to feed by flying low over the water surface and skimming the water for small fish.

Black-legged kittiwake, Rissa tridactyla (A)
Bonaparte's gull, Chroicocephalus philadelphia (A)
Laughing gull, Leucophaeus atricilla
Franklin's gull, Leucophaeus pipixcan (A)
Ring-billed gull, Larus delawarensis
Herring gull, Larus argentatus
Lesser black-backed gull, Larus fuscus (A)
Great black-backed gull, Larus marinus
Brown noddy, Anous stolidus
Sooty tern, Onychoprion fuscata
Bridled tern, Onychoprion anaethetus
Least tern, Sternula antillarum
Gull-billed tern, Gelochelidon nilotica
Caspian tern, Hydroprogne caspia
Black tern, Chlidonias niger
Roseate tern, Sterna dougallii
Common tern, Sterna hirundo
Forster's tern, Sterna forsteri
Royal tern, Thalasseus maxima
Sandwich tern, Thalasseus sandvicensis
Black skimmer, Rynchops niger

Tropicbirds
Order: PhaethontiformesFamily: Phaethontidae

Tropicbirds are slender white birds of tropical oceans with exceptionally long central tail feathers. Their heads and long wings have black markings.

White-tailed tropicbird, Phaethon lepturus
Red-billed tropicbird, Phaethon aethereus

Southern storm-petrels
Order: ProcellariiformesFamily: Oceanitidae

The storm-petrels are the smallest seabirds, relatives of the petrels, feeding on planktonic crustaceans and small fish picked from the surface, typically while hovering. The flight is fluttering and sometimes bat-like. Until 2018, the family's species were included with the other storm-petrels in family Hydrobatidae.

Wilson's storm-petrel, Oceanites oceanicus (A)

Northern storm-petrels
Order: ProcellariiformesFamily: Hydrobatidae

Though the members of the family are similar in many respects to the southern storm-petrels, including their general appearance and habits, there are enough genetic differences to warrant their placement in a separate family.

Leach's storm-petrel, Hydrobates leucorhous (A)

Shearwaters and petrels
Order: ProcellariiformesFamily: Procellariidae

The procellariids are the main group of medium-sized "true petrels", characterised by united nostrils with medium septum and a long outer functional primary.

Black-capped petrel, Pterodroma hasitata
Great shearwater, Ardenna gravis (A)
Manx shearwater, Puffinus puffinus (A)
Audubon's shearwater, Puffinus lherminieri (A)

Storks
Order: CiconiiformesFamily: Ciconiidae

Storks are large, long-legged, long-necked, wading birds with long, stout bills. Storks are mute, but bill-clattering is an important mode of communication at the nest. Their nests can be large and may be reused for many years. Many species are migratory.

Jabiru, Jabiru mycteria
Wood stork, Mycteria americana

Frigatebirds
Order: SuliformesFamily: Fregatidae

Frigatebirds are large seabirds usually found over tropical oceans. They are large, black-and-white, or completely black, with long wings and deeply forked tails. The males have colored inflatable throat pouches. They do not swim or walk and cannot take off from a flat surface. Having the largest wingspan-to-body-weight ratio of any bird, they are essentially aerial, able to stay aloft for more than a week.

Magnificent frigatebird, Fregata magnificens

Boobies and gannets
Order: SuliformesFamily: Sulidae

The sulids comprise the gannets and boobies. Both groups are medium to large coastal seabirds that plunge-dive for fish.

Masked booby, Sula dactylatra
Brown booby, Sula leucogaster
Red-footed booby, Sula sula

Anhingas
Order: SuliformesFamily: Anhingidae

Darters are often called "snake-birds" because of their long thin neck, which gives a snake-like appearance when they swim with their bodies submerged. The males have black and dark-brown plumage, an erectile crest on the nape, and a larger bill than the female. The females have much paler plumage especially on the neck and underparts. The darters have completely webbed feet and their legs are short and set far back on the body. Their plumage is somewhat permeable, like that of cormorants, and they spread their wings to dry after diving.

Anhinga, Anhinga anhinga (A)

Cormorants and shags
Order: SuliformesFamily: Phalacrocoracidae

Phalacrocoracidae is a family of medium to large coastal, fish-eating seabirds that includes cormorants and shags. Plumage coloration varies, with the majority having mainly dark plumage, some species being black-and-white, and a few being colorful.

Double-crested cormorant, Nannopterum auritum
Neotropic cormorant, Nannopterum brasilianum (A)

Pelicans
Order: PelecaniformesFamily: Pelecanidae

Pelicans are large water birds with a distinctive pouch under their beak. As with other members of the order Pelecaniformes, they have webbed feet with four toes.

American white pelican, Pelecanus erythrorhynchos (A)
Brown pelican, Pelecanus occidentalis

Herons, egrets, and bitterns
Order: PelecaniformesFamily: Ardeidae

The family Ardeidae contains the bitterns, herons, and egrets. Herons and egrets are medium to large wading birds with long necks and legs. Bitterns tend to be shorter necked and more wary. Members of Ardeidae fly with their necks retracted, unlike other long-necked birds such as storks, ibises, and spoonbills.

American bittern, Botaurus lentiginosus
Least bittern, Ixobrychus exilis
Great blue heron, Ardea herodias
Great egret, Ardea alba
Little egret, Egretta garzetta (A)
Snowy egret, Egretta thula
Little blue heron, Egretta caerulea
Tricolored heron, Egretta tricolor
Reddish egret, Egretta rufescens
Cattle egret, Bubulcus ibis
Green heron, Butorides virescens
Black-crowned night-heron, Nycticorax nycticorax
Yellow-crowned night-heron, Nyctanassa violacea

Ibises and spoonbills
Order: PelecaniformesFamily: Threskiornithidae

Threskiornithidae is a family of large terrestrial and wading birds which includes the ibises and spoonbills. They have long, broad wings with 11 primary and about 20 secondary feathers. They are strong fliers and despite their size and weight, very capable soarers.

White ibis, Eudocimus albus
Glossy ibis, Plegadis falcinellus
Roseate spoonbill, Platalea ajaja

New World vultures
Order: CathartiformesFamily: Cathartidae

The New World vultures are not closely related to Old World vultures, but superficially resemble them because of convergent evolution. Like the Old World vultures, they are scavengers. However, unlike Old World vultures, which find carcasses by sight, New World vultures have a good sense of smell with which they locate carrion.

Turkey vulture, Cathartes aura

Osprey
Order: AccipitriformesFamily: Pandionidae

The family Pandionidae contains only one species, the osprey. The osprey is a medium-large raptor which is a specialist fish-eater with a worldwide distribution.

Osprey, Pandion haliaetus

Hawks, eagles, and kites
Order: AccipitriformesFamily: Accipitridae

Accipitridae is a family of birds of prey, which includes hawks, eagles, kites, harriers, and Old World vultures. These birds have powerful hooked beaks for tearing flesh from their prey, strong legs, powerful talons, and keen eyesight.

Swallow-tailed kite, Elanoides forficatus (A)
Northern harrier, Circus hudsonius
Sharp-shinned hawk, Accipiter striatus
Mississippi kite, Ictinia mississippiensis (A) 
Ridgway's hawk, Buteo ridgwayi (E-H)
Broad-winged hawk, Buteo platypterus (A)
Swainson's hawk, Buteo swainsoni (A)
Red-tailed hawk, Buteo jamaicensis

Barn-owls
Order: StrigiformesFamily: Tytonidae

Barn-owls are medium to large owls with large heads and characteristic heart-shaped faces. They have long strong legs with powerful talons.

Barn owl, Tyto alba
Ashy-faced owl, Tyto glaucops (E-H)

Owls
Order: StrigiformesFamily: Strigidae

The typical owls are small to large solitary nocturnal birds of prey. They have large forward-facing eyes and ears, a hawk-like beak, and a conspicuous circle of feathers around each eye called a facial disk.

Burrowing owl, Athene cunicularia
Stygian owl, Asio stygius
Short-eared owl, Asio flammeus

Trogons
Order: TrogoniformesFamily: Trogonidae

The family Trogonidae includes trogons and quetzals. Found in tropical woodlands worldwide, they feed on insects and fruit, and their broad bills and weak legs reflect their diet and arboreal habits. Although their flight is fast, they are reluctant to fly any distance. Trogons have soft, often colorful, feathers with distinctive male and female plumage.

Hispaniolan trogon, Priotelus roseigaster (E-H)

Todies
Order: CoraciiformesFamily: Todidae

Todies are a group of small near-passerine forest species endemic to the Caribbean. These birds have colorful plumage and resemble small kingfishers, but have flattened bills with serrated edges. They eat small prey such as insects and lizards.

Broad-billed tody, Todus subulatus (E-H)
Narrow-billed tody, Todus angustirostris (E-H)

Kingfishers
Order: CoraciiformesFamily: Alcedinidae

Kingfishers are medium-sized birds with large heads, long, pointed bills, short legs, and stubby tails.

Belted kingfisher, Megaceryle alcyon

Woodpeckers
Order: PiciformesFamily: Picidae

Woodpeckers are small to medium-sized birds with chisel-like beaks, short legs, stiff tails, and long tongues used for capturing insects. Some species have feet with two toes pointing forward and two backward, while several species have only three toes. Many woodpeckers have the habit of tapping noisily on tree trunks with their beaks.

Antillean piculet, Nesoctites micromegas (E-H)
Hispaniolan woodpecker, Melanerpes striatus (E-H)
Yellow-bellied sapsucker, Sphyrapicus varius

Falcons and caracaras
Order: FalconiformesFamily: Falconidae

Falconidae is a family of diurnal birds of prey. They differ from hawks, eagles, and kites in that they kill with their beaks instead of their talons.

American kestrel, Falco sparverius
Merlin, Falco columbarius
Peregrine falcon, Falco peregrinus

New World and African parrots
Order: PsittaciformesFamily: Psittacidae

Parrots are small to large birds with a characteristic curved beak. Their upper mandibles have slight mobility in the joint with the skull and they have a generally erect stance. All parrots are zygodactyl, having the four toes on each foot placed two at the front and two to the back.
Olive-throated parakeet, Eupsittula nana (I)
Cuban macaw, Ara tricolor (Extinct)
Hispaniolan parakeet, Psittacara chloropterus (E-H)
Hispaniolan parrot, Amazona ventralis (E-H)

Tyrant flycatchers
Order: PasseriformesFamily: Tyrannidae

Tyrant flycatchers are passerine birds which occur throughout North and South America. They superficially resemble the Old World flycatchers, but are more robust and have stronger bills. They do not have the sophisticated vocal capabilities of the songbirds. Most, but not all, have plain coloring. As the name implies, most are insectivorous.

Greater Antillean elaenia, Elaenia fallax
Great crested flycatcher, Myiarchus crinitus (A)
Stolid flycatcher, Myiarchus stolidus
Gray kingbird, Tyrannus dominicensis
Loggerhead kingbird, Tyrannus caudifasciatus
Scissor-tailed flycatcher, Tyrannus forficatus (A)
Fork-tailed flycatcher, Tyrannus savana (A)
Eastern wood-pewee, Contopus virens (A)
Hispaniolan pewee, Contopus hispaniolensis (E-H)

Vireos, shrike-babblers, and erpornis
Order: PasseriformesFamily: Vireonidae

The vireos are a group of small to medium-sized passerine birds. They are typically greenish in color and resemble New World warblers apart from their heavier bills.

White-eyed vireo, Vireo griseus (A)
Flat-billed vireo, Vireo nanus (E-H)
Yellow-throated vireo, Vireo flavifrons
Philadelphia vireo, Vireo philadelphicus (A)
Warbling vireo, Vireo gilvus (A) 
Red-eyed vireo, Vireo olivaceus 
Black-whiskered vireo, Vireo altiloquus

Crows, jays, and magpies
Order: PasseriformesFamily: Corvidae

The family Corvidae includes crows, ravens, jays, choughs, magpies, treepies, nutcrackers, and ground jays. Corvids are above average in size among the Passeriformes, and some of the larger species show high levels of intelligence.

Palm crow, Corvus palmarum
White-necked crow, Corvus leucognaphalus (E-H)

Swallows
Order: PasseriformesFamily: Hirundinidae

The family Hirundinidae is adapted to aerial feeding. They have a slender streamlined body, long pointed wings, and a short bill with a wide gape. The feet are adapted to perching rather than walking, and the front toes are partially joined at the base.

Bank swallow, Riparia riparia (A)
Tree swallow, Tachycineta bicolor
Golden swallow, Tachycineta euchrysea
Northern rough-winged swallow, Stelgidopteryx serripennis
Purple martin, Progne subis
Cuban martin, Progne cryptoleuca (A)
Caribbean martin, Progne dominicensis
Barn swallow, Hirundo rustica
Cliff swallow, Petrochelidon pyrrhonota (A)
Cave swallow, Petrochelidon fulva

Kinglets
Order: PasseriformesFamily: Regulidae

The kinglets, also called crests, are a small group of birds often included in the Old World warblers, but frequently given family status because they also resemble the titmice.

Ruby-crowned kinglet, Corthylio calendula (A)

Palmchat
Order: PasseriformesFamily: Dulidae

The palmchat is the only member of its family. Its name indicates its strong association with palms for feeding, roosting, and nesting.

Palmchat, Dulus dominicus (E-H)

Waxwings
Order: PasseriformesFamily: Bombycillidae

The waxwings are a group of birds with soft silky plumage and unique red tips to some of the wing feathers. In the Bohemian and cedar waxwings, these tips look like sealing wax and give the group its name. These are arboreal birds of northern forests. They live on insects in summer and berries in winter.

Cedar waxwing, Bombycilla cedrorum (A)

Gnatcatchers
Order: PasseriformesFamily: Polioptilidae

These dainty birds resemble Old World warblers in their structure and habits, moving restlessly through the foliage seeking insects. The gnatcatchers are mainly soft bluish gray in color and have the typical insectivore's long sharp bill. Many species have distinctive black head patterns (especially males) and long, regularly cocked, black-and-white tails.

Blue-gray gnatcatcher, Polioptila caerulea (A)

Mockingbirds and thrashers
Order: PasseriformesFamily: Mimidae

The mimids are a family of passerine birds that includes thrashers, mockingbirds, tremblers, and the New World catbirds. These birds are notable for their vocalizations, especially their ability to mimic a wide variety of birds and other sounds heard outdoors. Their coloring tends towards dull-grays and browns.

Gray catbird, Dumetella carolinensis (A)
Pearly-eyed thrasher, Margarops fuscatus
Northern mockingbird, Mimus polyglottos

Thrushes and allies
Order: PasseriformesFamily: Turdidae

The thrushes are a group of passerine birds that occur mainly in the Old World. They are plump, soft plumaged, small to medium-sized insectivores or sometimes omnivores, often feeding on the ground. Many have attractive songs.

Rufous-throated solitaire, Myadestes genibarbis
Veery, Catharus fuscescens (A)
Bicknell's thrush, Catharus bicknelli
Swainson's thrush, Catharus ustulatus
Wood thrush, Hylocichla mustelina (A)
American robin, Turdus migratorius (A)
La Selle thrush, Turdus swalesi (E-H)
Red-legged thrush, Turdus plumbeus

Weavers and allies
Order: PasseriformesFamily: Ploceidae

The weavers are small passerine birds related to the finches. They are seed-eating birds with rounded conical bills. The males of many species are brightly colored, usually in red or yellow and black, and some species show variation in color only in the breeding season.

Village weaver, Ploceus cucullatus (I)

Waxbills and allies
Order: PasseriformesFamily: Estrildidae

The estrildid finches are small passerine birds of the Old World tropics and Australasia. They are gregarious and often colonial seed eaters with short thick but pointed bills. They are all similar in structure and habits, but have wide variation in plumage colors and patterns.

Scaly-breasted munia, Lonchura punctulata (I)
Tricolored munia, Lonchura malacca (I)
Chestnut munia, Lonchura atricapilla (I)
Red avadavat, Amandava amandava (I) (A)

Old World sparrows
Order: PasseriformesFamily: Passeridae

Sparrows are small passerine birds. In general, sparrows tend to be small, plump, brown or gray birds with short tails and short powerful beaks. Sparrows are seed eaters, but they also consume small insects.

House sparrow, Passer domesticus (I)

Wagtails and pipits
Order: PasseriformesFamily: Motacillidae

Motacillidae is a family of small passerine birds with medium to long tails. They include the wagtails, longclaws, and pipits. They are slender ground-feeding insectivores of open country.

American pipit, Anthus rubescens (A)

Finches, euphonias, and allies
Order: PasseriformesFamily: Fringillidae

Finches are seed-eating passerine birds that are small to moderately large and have a strong beak, usually conical and in some species very large. All have twelve tail feathers and nine primaries. These birds have a bouncing flight with alternating bouts of flapping and gliding on closed wings, and most sing well.

Antillean euphonia, Chlorophonia musica
Hispaniolan crossbill, Loxia megaplaga (E-H)
Antillean siskin, Spinus dominicensis (E-H)

New World sparrows
Order: PasseriformesFamily: Passerellidae

Until 2017, these species were considered part of the family Emberizidae. Most of the species are known as sparrows, but these birds are not closely related to the Old World sparrows which are in the family Passeridae. Many of these have distinctive head patterns.

Grasshopper sparrow, Ammodramus savannarum
Rufous-collared sparrow, Zonotrichia capensis
Savannah sparrow, Passerculus sandwichensis (A)
Song sparrow, Melospiza melodia (A)
Lincoln's sparrow, Melospiza lincolnii (A)

Chat-tanagers
Order: PasseriformesFamily: Calyptophilidae

These two species were formerly classified as tanagers (family Thraupidae) but were placed in their own family in 2017.

Western chat-tanager, Calyptophilus tertius (E-H)
Eastern chat-tanager, Calyptophilus frugivorus (E-H)

Hispaniolan tanagers
Order: PasseriformesFamily: Phaenicophilidae

The members of the small family were formerly classified as tanagers and New World warblers (family Parulidae) but were placed in their own family in 2017.

Black-crowned palm-tanager, Phaenicophilus palmarum (E-H)
Gray-crowned palm-tanager, Phaenicophilus poliocephalus (E-H)
White-winged warbler, Xenoligea montana (E-H)
Green-tailed warbler, Microligea palustris (E-H)

Spindalises
Order: PasseriformesFamily: Spindalidae

The members of the small family are native to the Greater Antilles. They were formerly classified as tanagers but were placed in their own family in 2017.

Hispaniolan spindalis, Spindalis dominicensis (E-H)

Yellow-breasted chat
Order: PasseriformesFamily: Icteriidae

The species was historically placed in the New World warblers but nonetheless most authorities were unsure if it belonged there. It was moved to its own family in 2017.

Yellow-breasted chat, Icteria virens (A)

Troupials and allies
Order: PasseriformesFamily: Icteridae

The icterids are a group of small to medium-sized, often colorful, passerine birds restricted to the New World and include the grackles, New World blackbirds, and New World orioles. Most species have black as the predominant plumage color, often enlivened by yellow, orange, or red.

Yellow-headed blackbird, Xanthocephalus xanthocephalus (A)
Bobolink, Dolichonyx oryzivorus (A)
Hispaniolan oriole, Icterus dominicensis (E-H)
Orchard oriole, Icterus spurius (A)
Baltimore oriole, Icterus galbula
Tawny-shouldered blackbird, Agelaius humeralis
Shiny cowbird, Molothrus bonariensis
Great-tailed grackle, Quiscalus mexicanus (A)
Greater Antillean grackle, Quiscalus niger

New World warblers
Order: PasseriformesFamily: Parulidae

The New World warblers are a group of small, often colorful, passerine birds restricted to the New World. Most are arboreal, but some are terrestrial. Most members of the family are insectivores.

Ovenbird, Seiurus aurocapilla
Worm-eating warbler, Helmitheros vermivorum
Louisiana waterthrush, Parkesia motacilla
Northern waterthrush, Parkesia noveboracensis
Golden-winged warbler, Vermivora chrysoptera (A)
Blue-winged warbler, Vermivora cyanoptera
Black-and-white warbler, Mniotilta varia
Prothonotary warbler, Protonotaria citrea
Swainson's warbler, Limnothlypis swainsonii (A)
Tennessee warbler, Leiothlypis peregrina
Nashville warbler, Leiothlypis ruficapilla (A)
Connecticut warbler, Oporornis agilis
Mourning warbler, Geothlypis philadelphia
Kentucky warbler, Geothlypis formosa
Common yellowthroat, Geothlypis trichas
Hooded warbler, Setophaga citrina
American redstart, Setophaga ruticilla
Cape May warbler, Setophaga tigrina
Northern parula, Setophaga americana
Magnolia warbler, Setophaga magnolia
Bay-breasted warbler, Setophaga castanea (A)
Blackburnian warbler, Setophaga fusca (A)
Yellow warbler, Setophaga petechia
Chestnut-sided warbler, Setophaga pensylvanica (A)
Blackpoll warbler, Setophaga striata
Black-throated blue warbler, Setophaga caerulescens
Palm warbler, Setophaga palmarum
Pine warbler, Setophaga pinus
Yellow-rumped warbler, Setophaga coronata
Yellow-throated warbler, Setophaga dominica
Kirtland's warbler, Setophaga kirtlandii 
Prairie warbler, Setophaga discolor
Black-throated green warbler, Setophaga virens
Canada warbler, Cardellina canadensis (A)
Wilson's warbler, Cardellina pusilla (A)

Cardinals and allies
Order: PasseriformesFamily: Cardinalidae

The cardinals are a family of robust, seed-eating birds with strong bills. They are typically associated with open woodland. The sexes usually have distinct plumages.

Summer tanager, Piranga rubra (A)
Scarlet tanager, Piranga olivacea (A)
Western tanager, Piranga ludoviciana (A)
Rose-breasted grosbeak, Pheucticus ludovicianus
Blue grosbeak, Passerina caerulea (A)
Indigo bunting, Passerina cyanea
Painted bunting, Passerina ciris (A)

Tanagers and allies
Order: PasseriformesFamily: Thraupidae

The tanagers are a large group of small to medium-sized passerine birds restricted to the New World, mainly in the tropics. Many species are brightly colored. As a family they are omnivorous, but individual species specialize in eating fruits, seeds, insects, or other types of food. Most have short, rounded wings.

Bananaquit, Coereba flaveola
Yellow-faced grassquit, Tiaris olivaceus
Greater Antillean bullfinch, Melopyrrha violacea
Black-faced grassquit, Melanospiza bicolor

Notes

References

See also
List of birds
Lists of birds by region

Dominican Republic
'
'Dominican Republic
birds